This is a detailed discography for American country music artist Porter Wagoner.

Albums

1950s and 1960s

1970s

-@ also made the Hot 100 at position 190

1980s

2000s

Singles

1950s

1960s

1970s

1980s–2000s

Other singles

Guest singles

Music videos

Notes

A^ "The Carroll County Accident" also peaked at number 80 on the RPM Top Singles chart in Canada.

See also
Porter Wagoner and Dolly Parton discography

Country music discographies
Discographies of American artists